Holtby railway station was a station on the York to Beverley Line in North Yorkshire, England. It opened as Gate Helmsley in 1848 and was renamed Holtby in 1872. Passenger services ended in 1939 and goods services in 1951.

History

Gate Helmsley station served the villages of Gate Helmsley and Holtby. It first appeared in timetables in June 1848, after the railway between York and Market Weighton had already been opened on 1 October 1847. The station was renamed to Holtby on 1 February 1872 to avoid confusion with similarly named stations elsewhere, although Holtby is further away from the station than Gate Helmsley. It had two platforms and on the down side an L-shaped brick-built station building designed by George Townsend Andrews which incorporated the stationmasters' home and the station offices. The up platform had a timber waiting shelter. The goods yard had only two sidings, one of them serving coal drops. It did not handle livestock. The station closed to passengers on 11 September 1939. Goods services ceased on 1 January 1951.

References

Sources

 

Disused railway stations in North Yorkshire
Railway stations in Great Britain opened in 1848
Railway stations in Great Britain closed in 1939
1847 establishments in England
Former York and North Midland Railway stations
George Townsend Andrews railway stations